The following lists events that happened in 2010 in Lebanon.

Incumbents
President: Michel Suleiman 
Prime Minister: Saad Hariri

Events

January

February

March

April

May

June

July

August

September

October

November

December

Deaths
4 July – Mohammad Hussein Fadlallah, Shia cleric (born 1935)

Full date unknown
As'ad Adib Bayudh, Lebanese Greek Orthodox politician.

References

 
Lebanon
2010s in Lebanon
Years of the 21st century in Lebanon
Lebanon